Hendricus Leopold (29 August 1918 – 16 July 2008) was a Dutch diplomat. He helped prepare the opening of an embassy in Indonesia. He served as first ambassador of the Netherlands to Suriname, and as ambassador to India.

Biography
Leopold was born on 29 August 1918 in Middelburg. He started working for the Ministry of Foreign Affairs. In 1963, he was appointed quarter maker in Jakarta to prepare the opening of the first embassy in Indonesia.

In March 1975, Leopold was sent to Suriname to establish a pre-embassy in preparation of the independence of Suriname. On 26 November 1975, the day after independence, he was installed as first ambassador to Suriname. In 1978, he was appointed ambassador to India and non-resident ambassador to Sri Lanka. In 1983, he retired.

Leopold died on 16 July 2008 in Lochem, at the age of 89.

Honours
: Knight of the Order of Orange-Nassau.
: Grand Cordon of the Honorary Order of the Palm.

References

1918 births
2008 deaths
People from Middelburg, Zeeland
Ambassadors of the Netherlands to Suriname
Ambassadors of the Netherlands to India
Dutch diplomats
Knights of the Order of Orange-Nassau